Paul Yelverton Coble (born October 19, 1953, in Raleigh, North Carolina) served one term as Mayor of Raleigh, North Carolina from December 1999 to December 2001. Coble served on the Wake County Board of Commissioners from 2006 to 2014, and served as chairman of the board from 2010 to 2012. In 2015, he became the Legislative Services Officer for the North Carolina General Assembly.

Early life
Coble is the son of Jack and Betsey Coble and the nephew of the late U.S. Senator Jesse Helms. He attended Needham B. Broughton High School, earned a Bachelor of Science degree at Wake Forest University in business. In 1992, he completed a Registered Health Underwriter designation through Northeastern University.

Political career
Coble served on Raleigh City Council from 1993 to 1999. While on the council, he served as chairman of the budget committee and the planning committee.  He also served as mayor pro tem.  Councilman Coble worked to cut the tax rate four times.  Like his predecessor, Mayor Tom Fetzer, he was a conservative Republican. He was sworn in as Mayor on December 7, 1999, after winning the 1999 Raleigh mayoral election. Coble served until 2001. During Coble's term as mayor, the city had to rapidly respond to a record 25-inch snow storm and opened the Progress Energy Center for the Performing Arts. Coble focused on public safety issues and promoted a program to prosecute gun violence under Federal laws.

Coble ran for reelection in 2001, facing Democrat Charles Meeker. On the first ballot, with a voter turnout of about 40,000 people, Coble received 49.15% of the votes while his opponent garnered 47.65%. In the subsequent run-off election voter turnout climbed to approximately 50,000 and Meeker defeated Coble, 50.97% to 48.87% of the votes. The following year, Coble ran unsuccessfully for a seat in the North Carolina State Senate against Democrat Eric Reeves. Reeves won with 49.29% of the votes to Coble's 48.39%.

In 2006, Coble sought a comeback to elective office by running for an open seat on the Wake County Board of Commissioners. He handily defeated Air Force veteran Rodger Koopman 54.42% to 45.58%.  Coble served as chairman of the Public Safety Committee and serves on the Wake County Fire Commission.  He was re-elected to the commission in 2010, defeating Wake County attorney and former Wake County Democratic Party chair Jack Nichols.  Coble served as chairman of the commissioners for two terms, in both 2011 and 2012. In private life, Coble was in the insurance business.  He is married to Connie Coble and has two daughters, Courtney and Paige.

In December 2008, Coble downplayed reports that he was considering running for Governor of North Carolina in the 2012 election, challenging Bev Perdue.  Instead, he later announced that he would run for the U.S. House in North Carolina's 13th congressional district, then occupied by U.S. Representative Brad Miller.

2012 Congressional Run
Coble, former U.S. Attorney George E.B. Holding, and 2010 nominee Bill Randall ran for the Republican nomination. 
Former Winston-Salem city council member Vernon Robinson and Nathan Tabor, who ran unsuccessfully in the 5th district in 2004, had both planned to seek the Republican nomination in the 13th district in 2012, but Robinson instead ran in the 8th district, while Tabor declined to run as a result of changes made to the district in redistricting. On May 8, George Holding won the Republican primary with almost 44 percent of the vote.

References

External links

1953 births
County commissioners in North Carolina
Living people
Mayors of Raleigh, North Carolina
Wake Forest University alumni
North Carolina Republicans
Raleigh City Council members